Jacqui Gordon (born 1962, Melbourne) credited also Jacqui Lockhead, is an Australian actress.  She appeared in television dramas, including Prisoner as Susie Driscoll, Cop Shop, Homicide, Matlock Police , Division 4, The Sullivans, The Flying Doctors and Neighbours as Kerry O'Donnell.

She toured the United Kingdom in a stage play version of Prisoner in 1990.

Selected filmography

References

External links

Actresses from Melbourne
Australian film actresses
Australian soap opera actresses
Living people
1962 births
20th-century Australian actresses
21st-century Australian women
21st-century Australian people